Angel Face is a 2018 French drama film directed by Vanessa Filho, from a screenplay by Filho and Diastéme. It stars Marion Cotillard, Ayline Aksoy-Etaix, Alban Lenoir, Amélie Daure and Stéphane Rideau. It had its world premiere at the 2018 Cannes Film Festival in May. It is scheduled to be released on 23 May 2018, by Mars Distribution.

Plot
Marlene is an erratic young mother from a working-class background who was left by her husband when she cheated on him during their wedding ceremony. Unemployed, she spends her days watching reality TV shows and getting drunk. Her only source of happiness and pride is Elli, her 8-year-old daughter, whom Marlene affectionately calls "Angel Face". But for the young girl, coping with her mother and her alcoholism is a daily struggle, which makes her mature early.

Cast
 Marion Cotillard as Marlène
 Ayline Aksoy-Etaix as Ellie
 Alban Lenoir as Julio
 Amélie Daure as Chiara
 Nade Dieu as Mathilda
 Stéphane Rideau as Jean
 Rosaline Gohy as Alice

Production
In September 2017, it was announced Marion Cotillard, Ayline Aksoy-Etaix, Alban Lenoir, Amélie Daure had joined the cast of the film, with Vanessa Filho directing from a screenplay she wrote alongside Diastéme. Carole Lambert and Marc Missonnier will produce the film, under their Windy Productions and Moana Films banner, respectively.

Filming
Principal photography began in October 2017.

Release
It was selected to compete in the Un Certain Regard section at the 2018 Cannes Film Festival. It is scheduled to be released on 23 May 2018, by Mars Distribution.

Reception

References

External links
 
 
 GUEULE D'ANGE at Mars Films

2018 films
2018 drama films
French drama films
2010s French-language films
2010s French films